Alexander County Schools is the public school system for all of Alexander County, North Carolina. 11 schools are located in the district.

Governance
The primary governing body of Alexander County Schools follows a council–manager government format with a seven-member Board of Education appointing a Superintendent to run the day-to-day operations of the system. The school system is in the NC State Board of Education's Seventh District.

Board of Education
The seven-member Alexander County Schools Board of Education meets on the second Tuesday of every month. The current members of the board are: Caryn Brzykcy (Chair), Scott Bowman (Vice-Chair), Sallie Hartis, Marty Pennell, David Odom, Brigette Rhyne, Harry Schrum.

Superintendent
The current superintendent of the system is Dr. Jennifer F. Hefner.

Member schools
Alexander County Schools has 11 schools ranging from pre-kindergarten to early college. Those 11 schools are separated into one early college, one high school, two middle schools and seven elementary schools.

Early College
 Alexander Early College (Taylorsville)

High school
 Alexander Central High School (Taylorsville)

Middle schools
 East Alexander Middle School (Hiddenite)
 West Alexander Middle School (Taylorsville)

Elementary schools
 Bethlehem Elementary School (Taylorsville)
 Ellendale Elementary School (Taylorsville)
 Hiddenite Elementary School (Hiddenite)
 Stony Point Elementary School (Stony Point)
 Sugar Loaf Elementary School (Taylorsville)
 Taylorsville Elementary School (Taylorsville)
 Wittenburg Elementary School (Taylorsville)

See also
List of school districts in North Carolina
North Carolina State Board of Education

References

External links
 

Education in Alexander County, North Carolina
School districts in North Carolina